The Al-Azhar University ("the University of (the honorable) Al-Azhar") is a public university in Cairo, Egypt. Associated with Al-Azhar Al-Sharif in Islamic Cairo, it is Egypt's oldest degree-granting university and is renowned as the most prestigious university for Islamic learning. In addition to higher education, Al-Azhar oversees a national network of schools with approximately two million students. As of 1996, over 4,000 teaching institutes in Egypt were affiliated with the university.

Founded in 970 or 972 by the Fatimid Caliphate as a centre of Islamic learning, its students studied the Qur'an and Islamic law in detail, along with logic, grammar, rhetoric, and how to calculate the phases of the moon. Today it is the chief centre of Arabic literature and Islamic learning in the world. In 1961 additional non-religious subjects were added to its curriculum.

Its library is considered second in importance in Egypt only to the Egyptian National Library and Archives. In May 2005, Al-Azhar in partnership with a Dubai information technology enterprise, IT Education Project (ITEP) launched the H.H. Mohammed bin Rashid Al Maktoum project to preserve Al Azhar scripts and publish them online (the "Al-Azhar Online Project") to eventually publish online access to the library's entire rare manuscripts collection, comprising about seven million pages of material.

History

Beginnings under the Fatimids 

Al-Azhar is one of the relics of the Isma'ili Shi'a Fatimid dynasty, which claimed descent from Fatimah, daughter of Muhammad and wife of Ali, son-in-law, and cousin of Muhammad. Fatimah was called al-Zahra (the luminous), and the institution was named in her honor. It was founded as a mosque by the Fatimid commander Jawhar al-Siqilli at the orders of the Caliph and Imam Al-Mu'izz li-Din Allah as he founded the city for Cairo. It was begun (probably on Saturday) in Jumada al-Awwal in the year AH 359 (March/April 970 CE). Its building was completed on the 9th of Ramadan in AH 361 (24 June 972 CE). Both Caliph al-Aziz Billah and Caliph Al-Hakim bi-Amr Allah added to its premises. It was further repaired, renovated, and extended by al-Mustansir Billah and al-Hafiz li-Din Allah. The Fatimid caliphs always encouraged scholars and jurists to have their study-circles and gatherings in this mosque and thus it was turned into a madrasa which has the claim to be considered as the oldest such institution still functioning.

Studies began at Al-Azhar in the month of Ramadan, 975. According to Syed Farid Alatas, the Jami'ah had faculties in Islamic law and jurisprudence, Arabic grammar, Islamic astronomy, Islamic philosophy, and logic. The Fatimids gave attention to the philosophical studies at the time when rulers in other countries declared those who were engaged in philosophical pursuits as apostates and heretics. Greek thought found a warm reception with the Fatimids who expanded the boundaries of such studies. They paid much attention to philosophy and gave support to everyone who was known for being engaged in the study of any branch of philosophy. The Fatimid Caliph invited many scholars from nearby countries and paid much attention to college books on various branches of knowledge and in gathering the finest writing on various subjects and this in order to encourage scholars and to uphold the cause of knowledge.

Saladin 

In the 12th century, following the overthrow of the Isma'ili Fatimid dynasty, Saladin (the founder of the Sunni Ayyubid Dynasty) converted Al-Azhar to a Shafi'ite Sunni center of learning. Therefore, "he had all the treasures of the palace, including the books, sold over a period of ten years. Many were burned, thrown into the Nile, or thrown into a great heap, which was covered with sand, so that a regular "hill of books" was formed and the soldiers used to sole their shoes with the fine bindings. The number of books said to have disposed of varies from 120,000 to 2,000,000." Abd-el-latif delivered lectures on Islamic medicine at Al-Azhar, while according to legend the Jewish philosopher Maimonides delivered lectures on medicine and astronomy there during the time of Saladin though no historical proof has corroborated this.

Saladin introduced the college system in Egypt, which was also adopted in Al-Azhar. Under this system, the college was a separate institution within the mosque compound, with its own classrooms, dormitories and a library.

Mamluks
Under the Mamluks, Al-Azhar gained influence and rose in prestige. 
The Mamluks established salaries for instructors and stipends for the students and gave the institution an endowment. A college was built for the institution in 1340, outside of the mosque. In the late 1400s, the buildings were renovated and new dormitories were built for the students.

During this time Cairo had 70 other institutions of Islamic learning, however, Al-Azhar attracted many scholars due to its prestige. The famed Ibn Khaldun taught at Al-Azhar starting in 1383.

During this time texts were few and much of the learning happened by students memorizing their teachers' lectures and notes. In fact, blind young boys were enrolled at Al-Azhar in the hopes that they could eventually earn a living as teachers.

Ottomans

During the Ottoman period, Al-Azhar's prestige and influence grew to the point of becoming the preeminent institution for Islamic learning in the Sunni Muslim world. During this time, the Shaykh Al-Azhar was established, an office given to the leading scholar at the institution; prior to this the head of the institution was not necessarily a scholar. In 1748, the Ottoman pasha tried to get Al-Azhar to teach astronomy and mathematics, to little avail.

During the time there wasn't a system of academic degrees, instead the shaykh (professor) determined if the student was sufficiently trained to enter a professor (ijazah). The average length of study was 6 years. Despite the lack of bureaucracy, the training remained rigorous and prolonged. Students were loosely organized into riwaq (a sort of fraternity) organized according to their nationality and branch of Islamic law they studied. Each riwaq was supervised by a professor. A rector, usually a senior professor, oversaw the finances.

Post-Ottoman

By the mid 19th century, al-Azhar had surpassed Istanbul and was considered the mecca of Sunni legal expertise; a main centre of power in the Islamic world; and a rival to Damascus, Mecca and Baghdad.

When the Kingdom of Egypt was established in 1923, the signing of the new nation's constitution was delayed  because of King Fuad I's insistence that Al-Azhar and other religious institutions were to be subject to him and not the Egyptian parliament. The King Fuad I Edition of the Qur’an was first published on 10 July 1924  by a committee from Al-Azhar University Prominent committee members included Islamic scholar, Muhammad b. ‘Ali al-Husayni al-Haddad. Noteworthy Western scholars/academics working in Egypt at the time include Bergsträsser and Jeffery. Methodological differences aside, speculation alludes to a spirit of cooperation.  Bergsträsser was certainly impressed with the work.

In  March 1924, Abdülmecid II had been deposed as Caliph, supreme religious and political leader of all Muslims across the world. The Grand Sheikh of al-Azhar repudiated the abolition and was part of a call from Al-Azhar for an Islamic Conference. The unsuccessful "caliphate conference" was held under the presidency of the Grand Chancellor of Azhar in 1926  but no one was able to gain a consensus for the candidacy across the Islamic world. Candidates  proposed for the caliphate included King Fuad.

Modernization
The pioneering Pakistani journalist Zaib-un-Nissa Hamidullah became the first woman to address the university in 1955. In 1961, Al-Azhar was re-established as a university under the government of Egypt's second President Gamal Abdel Nasser when a wide range of secular faculties were added for the first time, such as business, economics, science, pharmacy, medicine, engineering and agriculture. Before that date, the Encyclopaedia of Islam classifies the Al-Azhar variously as madrasa, center of higher learning and, since the 19th century, religious university, but not as a university in the full sense, referring to the modern transition process as "from madrasa to university". Other academic sources also refer to al-Azhar as a madrasa in pre-modern times before its transformation into a university. An Islamic women's faculty was also added in the same year, six years after Zaib-un-Nissa Hamidullah had been the first woman to speak at the university.

Religious ideology

Historically, Al-Azhar had a membership that represented diverse opinions within Islam. The theological schools of Al-Ashari and Al-Maturidi were both represented.  It has a long tradition of teaching all four schools of Sunni Islamic jurisprudence (Hanafi, Maliki, Shafi, and Hanbali). The chief mufti of each school of thought acted as the dean, responsible for the teachers and students in that group. During the time of the Ottomans, the Hanafi dean came to hold a position as primus inter pares. It also had membership from the seven main Sufi orders. Al-Azhar has had an antagonistic relationship with Wahhabism. According to a 2011 report issued by the Carnegie Endowment for International Peace, Al Azhar is strongly Sufi in character:
Adherence to a Sufi order has long been standard for both professors and students in the al-Azhar mosque and university system. Although al-Azhar is not monolithic, its identity has been strongly associated with Sufism. The current Shaykh al-Azhar (rector of the school), Ahmed el-Tayeb, is a hereditary Sufi shaykh from Upper Egypt who has recently expressed his support for the formation of a world Sufi league; the former Grand Mufti of Egypt and senior al-Azhar scholar Ali Gomaa is also a highly respected Sufi master.

However, in the early 20th century, enlightened Modernist thinkers such as Muhammad Abduh led a reform of the curriculum, reintroducing a desire for legal reform through ijtihad. Subsequently, disputes were had between modernist intellectuals and traditionalists within al-Azhar. Al-Azhar now maintains a modernist position, advocating "Wasatiyya" (centrism), a reaction against the extreme textualism of many Wahhabi Salafi ideologues. Wasatiyya covers a range of thinkers, some of whom are liberal intellectuals with religious inclinations, preachers such as Yusuf al-Qaradawi and many members of the Muslim Brotherhood since the 2013 coup however, Al-Azhar has taken a position against the brotherhood.

The nineteenth and current Grand Mufti of Egypt and Al Azhar scholar, is Shawki Ibrahim Abdel-Karim Allam. The university is opposed to overt liberal reform of Islam and issued a fatwa against the liberal Ibn Rushd-Goethe mosque in Berlin because it banned face-covering veils such as burqa and niqab on its premises while allowing women and men to pray together. The fatwa encompassed all present and future liberal mosques.

Council of Senior Scholars

Al-Azhar University's Council of Senior Scholars was founded in 1911 but was replaced in 1961 by the Center for Islamic Research. In July 2012, after the law restricting Al-Azhar University's autonomy was modified by the incoming president Mohamed Morsi, the council was reformed. The Council consists of 40 members and as of February 2013 had 14 vacancies all appointed by the current imam of Al-Azhar, Ahmed El-Tayeb, who was appointed by the prior president, Hosni Mubarak. Once the remaining 14 vacancies are filled, new vacancies will be appointed by the existing Council itself. All four madhahib (schools) of Sunni Islamic jurisprudence are proportionally represented on the council (Hanafi, Shafi'i, Hanbali, Maliki) and voting is on a majority basis. In addition to El-Tayeb, other prominent members of the Council include the outgoing Grand Mufti Ali Gomaa. The council is tasked with nominating the Grand Mufti of Egypt (subject to presidential approval), electing the next Grand Imam of Al-Azhar Mosque, and is expected to be the final authority in determining if new legislation is compliant with Islamic law. Although the council's decisions are not binding (absent new legislation), it is expected that it would be difficult for the parliament to pass legislation deemed by the council as against Islamic law.

In January 2013, Al-Tayeb referred a relatively minor issue related to Islamic bonds to the council, for the first time asserting the council's jurisdiction. In 2013, the Council elected Shawki Ibrahim Abdel-Karim Allam to be the next Grand Mufti of Egypt. This marks the first time that the Grand Mufti would be elected by Islamic scholars since the position was created in 1895. Prior to this, the Egyptian head of state made the appointment.

Views

Al-Azhar's muftis have a history of being consulted on political issues. Muhammad Ali Pasha appointed Al-Azhar muftis to the Consultative Council in 1829 and this would be repeated by Abbas I and later Isma'il Pasha. At the same time, there were many cases where the Egyptian ruler would disregard the opinion of Al-Azhar scholars.

Sheikh Muhammad Sayyid Tantawy noted that among the priorities of Muslims are "to master all knowledge of the world and the hereafter, not least the technology of modern weapons to strengthen and defend the community and faith". He added that "mastery over modern weaponry is important to prepare for any eventuality or prejudices of the others, although Islam is a religion of peace".

Sheikh Tantawy also reasserted that his is the best faith to follow and that Muslims have the duty of active da'wa. He has made declarations about Muslims interacting with non-Muslims who are not a threat to Muslims. There are non-Muslims living apart from Muslims and who are not enemies of Islam ("Muslims are allowed to undertake exchanges of interests with these non-Muslims so long as these ties do not tarnish the image of the faith"), and there are "the non-Muslims who live in the same country as the Muslims in cooperation and on friendly terms, and are not enemies of the faith" ("in this case, their rights and responsibilities are the same as the Muslims so long as they do not become enemies of Islam"). Shi'a fiqh (according to a fatwa by Al-Azhar) is accepted as a fifth school of Islamic thought.

In October 2007, Muhammad Sayyid Tantawy, then the Grand Imam of Al-Azhar, drew allegations of stifling freedom of speech when he asked the Egyptian government to toughen its rules and punishments against journalists. During a Friday sermon in the presence of Egyptian Prime Minister Ahmed Nazif and a number of ministers, Tantawy was alleged to have stated that journalism which contributes to the spread of false rumours rather than true news deserved to be boycotted, and that it was tantamount to sinning for readers to purchase such newspapers. Tantawy, a supporter of then Egyptian President Hosni Mubarak, also called for a punishment of eighty lashes to "those who spread rumors" in an indictment of speculation by journalists over Mubarak's ill health and possible death. This was not the first time that he had criticized the Egyptian press regarding its news coverage nor the first time he in return had been accused by the press of opposing freedom of speech. During a religious celebration in the same month, Tantawy had released comments alluding to "the arrogant and the pretenders who accuse others with the ugliest vice and unsubstantiated charges". In response, Egypt's press union issued a statement suggesting that Tantawy appeared to be involved in inciting and escalating a campaign against journalists and freedom of the press. Tantawy died in 2010 and was succeeded by Mohamed Ahmed el-Tayeb.

In 2016 Ahmed el-Tayeb reissued the fatwa on Shia Muslims, calling Shia the fifth school of Islam and seeing no problem with conversions from Sunni to Shia Islam. However, the NGOs report that violence and propaganda against the country's Shia minority continues. Shia Muslims are frequently denied services in addition to being called derogatory names. Anti-Shia sentiment is spread through education at all levels. Clerics educated at Al-Azhar University publicly promote sectarian beliefs by calling Shia Muslims infidels and encourage isolation and marginalization of Shia Muslims in Egypt.

Scholars from Al-Azhar declared the writings to Farag Foda to be blasphemous. Muhammad al-Ghazali, a member of Al-Azhar, declared Foda to be guilty of apostasy. According to Geneive Abdo, Muhammad al-Ghazali also added that anyone killing an apostate would not be punished, while according to Nathan Brown, Muhammad al-Ghazali stopped just short of condoning Foroda's assassination.
 Foda was assassinated in June 1992, by an Egyptian terrorist group al-Jama'a al-Islamiyya, who claimed justification from Al-Azhar's fatwas. In response, a scholar at Al-Azhar published Man Qatala Faraj Fawda.

Notable people associated with the university

10th–17th centuries
Fatimid commander Jawhar at the orders of the Caliph Al-Muizz (972)
Al-'Aziz Billah (975–996) 
Al-Hakim bi-Amr Allah (996–1021)
Al-Mustansir Billah (1021–1036) and Al-Hafiz Li-Din-illah
Ibn al-Haytham (965 –1040) Arab physicist, mathematician, astronomer and referred to as "the father of modern optics".
Sibt al-Maridini (1423 – 1506) Arab physicist, mathematician and astronomer.
Abd al-'Aziz al-Wafa'i (15th century) Arab physicist, mathematician and astronomer.
Abdul Qadir al-Baghdadi (1620–1682 AD) author, philologist, grammarian, magistrate, bibliophile and a leading literary encyclopedic of the Ottoman era.

19th – early 20th centuries
 Muhammad Abduh and Sayd Jamal edin Afghani, founder of Islamic Modernism
 Izz ad-Din al-Qassam, founder and leader of Black Hand
 Mohammad Amin al-Husayni, Mufti of Jerusalem
 Ahmed Orabi, Egyptian nationalist and army general who led the Urabi Revolt against Khedive Tewfik

1910s–1950s
 Hassan al-Banna, founder of the Muslim Brotherhood (he graduated from Dar al-Ulum which is an affiliate of Cairo University)
 Syed Mujtaba Ali, was a Bengali author, journalist, travel enthusiast, academic, scholar and linguist. Ali studied at the Al-Azhar University in Cairo during 1934–1935.
 Mehmed Handžić, a leader of Bosnian revivalists, one of authors of Resolution of Sarajevo Muslims and chairman of the Committee of National Salvation
 Omar Abdel Rahman, leader of Al-Gama'a al-Islamiyya, which has been designated a terrorist group by the governments of the United States and Egypt; currently serving a life term for the 1993 World Trade Center bombing
 Taqiuddin al-Nabhani, the leader and founder of The Islamic Political Party, Hizb ut-Tahrir (The Party of Liberation)
 Sheikh Ahmed Yassin, co-founder and leader of Hamas
 Saad Zaghlul, leader of 1919 revolution in Egypt
 Taha Hussein, Influential Egyptian writer and intellectual
 Muhammad Ma Jian, translator of the Qur'an into the Chinese language
 Ahmad Meshari Al-Adwani, Kuwaiti poet and writer of Kuwait's national anthem Al-Nasheed Al-Watani
 Ahmad al-Ghumari, Moroccan cleric, enrolled in 1921, dropped out due to a death in the family
 Abdullah al-Ghumari, Moroccan cleric, graduated from Azhar in 1931
 Abu Turab al-Zahiri, Indian-born Saudi Arabian writer

1950–present

 Aliko Dangote, Nigerian business mogul and richest man in Africa studied business at Al-Azhar
 Akhtar Raza Khan, former Grand Mufti of India.
Sayyid Abdurahman Imbichikoya Thangal Al-Qasimi, Al-Baqavi, Al Azhari (1930-2015) - Former president of Samastha Kerala Jamiat-ul-Ulema  (1995-2004) 
 Zaib-un-Nissa Hamidullah, Pakistani journalist who in 1955 became the first woman to give a speech at the university
 Mohammed Burhanuddin, Dai of Dawoodi Bohra researched and rediscovered Al-Azhar University's past History and was Awarded PhD from Al-Azhar University.
 Abdullah Yusuf Azzam Founder of the terrorist group Al-Qaeda, and a Palestinian Sunni Islamic scholar and theologian
 Shire Jama Ahmed, Somali linguist who devised a Latin script for the Somali language.
 Mahmud Shaltut, Grand Sheikh of Al-Azhar, issued in 1959 a Fatwa, declaring that Al-Azhar recognizes Shi'ism as a valid branch of Islam
 Mahmoud Khalil Al-Hussary, a renowned Qari and Qur'anic scholar.
 Abdel-Halim Mahmoud, Grand Sheikh of Al-Azhar, introduced the study of Sufism as a science through his writings and lectures on the matter
 Ahmed Subhy Mansour, Islamic scholar, cleric, and founder of the Quranists, who was exiled from Egypt, and lives in the United States as a political refugee
 Taha Jabir Alalwani, President of Cordoba University (Ashburn, VA, USA), former Chairman of the Fiqh Council of North America, and the President of the International Institute of Islamic Thought in Herndon, Virginia (USA).
 Abdurrahman Wahid, Former President of Indonesia
 Muhammad Sayyid Tantawy, former Grand Imam of Al-Azhar (17 March 1996 to 10 March 2010)
 Ahmed el-Tayeb, current Grand Imam of Al-Azhar.
 Muhammad Metwally Al Shaarawy is an Egyptian Muslim jurist
 Maumoon Abdul Gayoom, Former President of The Republic of Maldives.
 Sayyid Abdurahman Imbichikoya Thangal Al-Aydarusi Al-Azhari Al-Qasimi, Al-Baqavi, Islamic Scholar from Indian state, Kerala. Former President of Samastha Kerala Jamiat-ul-Ulema,(1995-2004). Writer of [Al Arab Wal Arabiyya(Arabs And Arabic Language)(Arabic: العرب والعربية )]
 Abdulla Saeed, Former Chief Justice, and Justice Supreme Court of The Republic of Maldives.
 Abdulla Mohamed, Chief Judge, Criminal Court of The Republic of Maldives.
 Salamat P. Hashim, founder and leader of the Moro Islamic Liberation Front in the Philippines.
 Sheikh Khalifa Usman Nando, co-founder of the Moro Islamic Liberation Front in the Philippines and Wa'lī of the Bangsamoro Autonomous Region in Muslim Mindanao.
 Fathulla Jameel, Former Foreign Minister of Maldives.
 Burhanuddin Rabbani, Former Soviet–Afghan War Mujahideen leader and president of Afghanistan
 Muhammad Jameel Didi, Maldives Author and writer
 Nik Abdul Aziz Nik Mat Mursyidul Am (Spiritual Leader) of the Pan-Malaysian Islamic Party (PAS) and former Menteri Besar (Chief Minister) of the Malaysian state of Kelantan
 Abdul Hadi Awang President of the Pan-Malaysian Islamic Party (PAS) and former Menteri Besar (Chief Minister) of the Malaysian state of Terengganu
 Omar Maute, co-founder and leader of the Maute terrorist organization in Marawi, Philippines.
 Panakkad Shihab Thangal A Muslim religious leader, politician and Islamic scholar from the Indian state of Kerala. Qazi to hundreds of mahals in Kerala, President IUML Kerala 1975–2009
 Saeed-ur-Rahman Azmi Nadvi Principal of Darul Uloom Nadwatul Ulama and chancellor of Integral University.
 Timothy Winter Founder of Muslim Cambridge College. He is also the Aziz Foundation Professor of Islamic Studies at both Cambridge Muslim College and Ebrahim College, Director of Studies (Theology and Religious Studies) at Wolfson College, and the Shaykh Zayed Lecturer of Islamic Studies in the Faculty of Divinity at the University of Cambridge.

See also

 Karwan-I-Islami
 List of presidents of Al-Azhar University
 List of universities in Egypt

Notes

References

Further reading

Online
 al-Azhar University: university, Cairo, Egypt(Subscription), in Encyclopædia Britannica Online, by The Editors of Encyclopædia Britannica, Laura Etheredge, Neha Parwani and Emily Rodriguez

External links

Al-Azhar University (in Arabic)
Al Furqan Academy
Al-Azhar Portal
Riwaq Al Quran
AlMaher Quran Academy
Mishkah Academy
Almuhammadi Academy
History and organization of Al-Azhar (English)
New Grand Sheikh at Al-Azhar University: Fighting Extremism in A Suit and Tie

Al-Azhar
 
Education in Cairo
Universities in Egypt
Islamic education in Egypt
Madrasas in Egypt
Medieval Cairo
Arabic architecture
Islamic architecture
Muizz Street
988 establishments
Buildings and structures completed in the 10th century
Educational institutions established in the 10th century
10th-century establishments in Egypt
Islamic universities and colleges
970s establishments
Cairo under the Fatimid Caliphate